Deepak Jain is an Indian politician of BJP from Indore Member of Indore Municipal Corporation since 20 February 2015.

References 

Living people
1979 births
People from Indore
Politicians from Indore
Bharatiya Janata Party politicians from Madhya Pradesh